Jadyn Wong is a Canadian actress, best known for playing mechanical prodigy Happy Quinn on the CBS show Scorpion.

Early life and education 
Jadyn Wong was born May 11, 1989 in Canada to immigrants from the then-British Hong Kong.  She completed her Bachelor of Commerce at the University of British Columbia. She has a black belt in karate and is also a classical pianist.

Career 

Jadyn Wong made her professional acting debut in the miniseries Broken Trail (2006) with Robert Duvall. Her first audition, she was handpicked for the role by Duvall after hundreds of actresses were auditioned across North America.
She also appeared in Space Buddies (2009) as a Chinese reporter; as April Jung in the short film The Letters (2010); as a Money Channel Interviewer in Cosmopolis (2012); as Diondra in Debug (2014); and as Molly in the TV movie Client Seduction (2014). In 2016, she played Altagracia in You're Killing Me Susana.

From 2014 to 2018, Wong starred in the CBS television series Scorpion as Happy Quinn. In 2018, she joined the cast of Needle in a Timestack, a science fiction film written and directed by John Ridley.

Filmography

Film

Television

References

External links 
 

Living people
Actresses from Alberta
Canadian actresses of Hong Kong descent
21st-century Canadian actresses
Canadian film actresses
Canadian television actresses
People from Medicine Hat
Canadian expatriate actresses in the United States
Year of birth missing (living people)